The I-95 derbies, also known as the Acela derbies are the various local soccer derbies between the teams located on the Interstate 95 highway and Northeast Corridor railway of the United States (the Northeast megalopolis). It specifically refers to individual games between the teams located along the corridor, but may also be used to describe the rivalries between the supporters groups. The first I-95 derby in the modern era of American soccer history took place during the 1996 Major League Soccer season, when the New England Revolution and D.C. United played each other on April 27, 1996. The match ended in a 1–1 tie.

Historically the most intense I-95 derbies between American soccer clubs is the Atlantic Cup rivalry between D.C. United and the New York Red Bulls, as well as the Hudson River derby, between the Red Bulls and New York City FC, based upon polls and pundit analysis.

Teams based along I-95

Major I-95 derbies

Some of the most heated rivalries are between clubs that are geographically close together, or clubs that play in the same league, including:

 Atlantic Cup – between D.C. United and New York Red Bulls – This rivalry is often considered one of the most intense rivalries of original MLS franchises, and one of the most intense rivalries on the East Coast
 Hudson River derby – between New York City FC and New York Red Bulls – This rivalry features Major League Soccer's two clubs based in the New York metropolitan area.
 Shertz–Gemmel Cup or Colonial Cup – between D.C. United and Philadelphia Union.

Other I-95 derbies 

 D.C. United–New England Revolution: historically, two of the most successful franchises in the Eastern Conference.
 New England Revolution–Philadelphia Union
 New York City FC–Philadelphia Union
 New York Red Bulls–New England Revolution
 New York Red Bulls–Philadelphia Union

See also
 Soccer in the United States

Notes

References

Soccer rivalries in the United States
D.C. United
New England Revolution
New York City FC
New York Red Bulls
Philadelphia Union
Richmond Kickers